The Argunov–Cassegrain telescope is a catadioptric telescope design first introduced in 1972 by P. P. Argunov. All optics are spherical, and the classical Cassegrain secondary mirror is replaced by a sub-aperture secondary corrector group consisting of three air-spaced elements, two lenses and a Mangin mirror (the element farthest from the primary mirror).

Discussion
Argunov systems only employ spherical surfaces and avoid the practical difficulties of making and testing aspheres. However, this benefit is marginal, as it is almost as difficult to make a true zone-free sphere of precise radius of curvature as it is to make an aspheric surface with comparable precision. Further, since multiple surfaces are involved, creating a design with good aberration correction can become very complicated.

See also
 Klevtsov–Cassegrain telescope
 List of telescope types

References

Further reading

External links
 
 

Telescope types